Patrick Philbin may refer to:

 Patrick F. Philbin, American lawyer and political appointee in the Trump and Bush administrations
 Patrick Philbin (athlete) (1874–1929), British tug of war competitor at the 1908 Summer Olympics